AJG may refer to:

 The American Journal of Gastroenterology, a medical journal
 Arthur J. Gallagher & Co., an insurance brokerage and risk management services company